Ipomea horsfalliae is a flowering plant in the family Convolvulaceae known by several common names including Lady Doorly's morning glory, cardinal creeper, and Prince Kuhio vine. It is native to the Caribbean and Brazil.

References

How to Setup Discord

horsfalliae
Flora of the Caribbean
Flora of Brazil
Flora without expected TNC conservation status